Black and White Rainbows is the seventh studio album by British alternative rock band Bush, released on 10 March 2017, through Zuma Rock Records and Caroline International. It is the follow up to the band's 2014 album, Man on the Run, and is the third featuring the lineup of Gavin Rossdale, Robin Goodridge, Chris Traynor and Corey Britz. It is the last album to feature longtime drummer Robin Goodridge, the only member other than Rossdale who had played on every album dating back to their 1994 debut Sixteen Stone which launched the band's career. He was also the only longtime member to rejoin Bush after their hiatus from 2002 to 2010.

Release

Album
Black and White Rainbows was released on 10 March 2017, through Zuma Rock Records. The album was released in the United Kingdom with the artist credited as "Bush with Gavin Rossdale" and had a sticker promoting The Voice, which Rossdale was a coach on during the show's sixth series. A remastered deluxe edition of the album on 13 October 2017 with a new extended tracklisting including new songs "This is War" and "Alien Language" along with extended versions of "Mad Love" and "Peace-S".

Singles
"People at War" was released alongside a music video in June 2016, in partnership with the UN Refugee Agency.

The lead single from the album, "Mad Love", was released on 6 February 2017.

"Lost in You" was the second song released from the album, on 24 February 2017.

"The Beat of Your Heart" was the third song released from the album, on 3 March 2017.

Content

Musical style 
In allusion to the style of Black and White Rainbows, Henry Yates of LouderSound detailed an "electro-tinged pop rock" sound "between U2 and Thirty Seconds To Mars". AllMusic remarked that Bush "managed to craft a collection of adult contemporary hard rock" with the record.

Critical reception

Black and White Rainbows received mixed reviews from music critics. At Metacritic, which assigns a normalized rating out of 100 to reviews from mainstream critics, the album has an average score of 49 based on 4 reviews, indicating "mixed or average reviews".

Neil Z. Yeung of AllMusic rated the album three out of five stars, calls it "an interesting piece of the Bush discography", and states that it "hints at a late-era trajectory shift and a reinvigorated spirit for Rossdale and company." In a two out of five star review, The Guardians Gwilym Mumford claims: "Album number seven sands down what little edge the band once had and buffs their sound to a banal, stadium-rock sheen."

Track listing
All songs were written by Gavin Rossdale; "Lost in You" was co-written by Dave Stewart.

Deluxe Edition remaster

Personnel
Credits adapted from AllMusicBush Gavin Rossdale – lead vocals, rhythm guitar 
 Chris Traynor – lead guitar
 Corey Britz – bass, backing vocals 
 Robin Goodridge – drumsTechnical personnel'
 John Ewing, Jr. – engineer, mixing
 Neil Krug – art direction, photography
 Stephen Marcussen – mastering
 Bob Rock – producer
 Gavin Rossdale – mixing, producer

Charts

Release history

References

2017 albums
Bush (British band) albums
Albums produced by Bob Rock
Caroline Records albums